Kenny Inglis is a musician, composer, and music producer from Glasgow, Scotland.

Career 
Kenny's music has featured across a broad spectrum of film and television. His work has featured in U.S. prime time dramas such as Six Feet Under and CSI, feature films, advertisements and video games. He has written for a number of trailers including Polisse, Dead Man Down, Gangster Squad, Undisputed Truth, and Fifty Shades Freed.

To date Kenny has scored six BAFTA winning features – The Bridge: Fifty Years Across The Forth (BBC), Violent Men: Behind Bars (C4), Murder Case (Series 1) (BBC), Murder Trial (BBC), Long Lost Family: Born Without Trace (Series 3) (ITV), and Murder Case (Series 2) (BBC).

Long Lost Family: Born Without Trace (Series 3) also won the Reality and Factual Entertainment Award at the Rose D’Or International Awards, 2021.

In 2021, Kenny wrote the new title music for Long Lost Family on ITV, which aired for the first time on 5 July.

Inglis has appeared under a number of artist pseudonyms, releasing material as Cinephile, Spylab, Kid Grenade, Studio Blue, and Imperfect Stranger.

His collaborations include Andy Bell (Oasis/Ride), Sophie Barker (Zero 7), The Stereo MCs, Concetta Kirschner (Princess Superstar), Ricky Ross (Deacon Blue), Paul McLinden (Memes), and Neil Ormandy (Transit).

References

External links 
 

Living people
People educated at Park Mains High School
Year of birth missing (living people)
Musicians from Glasgow
Scottish composers
21st-century Scottish musicians